Danube Province can refer to the following:

The former Danube Banovina of Yugoslavia
The former Danube Vilayet of the Ottoman Empire